Michael Kostroff (born May 22, 1961) is an American actor. He appeared on the HBO program The Wire as defense attorney Maurice Levy. Kostroff starred in the fifth season of the series and appeared in all four earlier seasons as a guest star.

Life and career 

Kostroff is best known for his five seasons playing drug lawyer Maury Levy on the HBO series The Wire, and from his recurring appearances on The Blacklist, Billions, The Good Wife, Law and Order: SVU, and on the Disney Channel series Sonny with a Chance as Marshall Pike, the executive producer and the creator of So Random!. He played Peter Madoff, brother of Bernie Madoff (Robert De Niro) in HBO's Wizard of Lies and Shepsie Tirschwell in David Simon's 2020 miniseries, The Plot Against America.

From 2002 to 2003, Kostroff performed in the first national tour of Mel Brooks' Broadway hit The Producers, and from 2003 to 2004, he played the comic villain Thénardier in the touring company of Les Misérables, a role he reprised for the 25th Anniversary Tour in 2010.

Kostroff is the author of the books Letters from Backstage (a chronicle of his time on the road with two Broadway tours), The Stage Actor's Handbook: Traditions, Protocols, and Etiquette for the Working and Aspiring Professional, Audition Psych 101 (based on his workshop of the same name), and Advice from 'The Working Actor''', (a textbook based around the Working Actor column in the weekly publication, Backstage).

He also volunteered on the Barack Obama campaign.

Kostroff is the brother of Nina Kostroff Noble, a television producer who was an executive producer of The Wire''.

Kostroff was one of the writers of "The Working Actor," a weekly Backstage advice column.

Filmography

References

External links
 

1961 births
Living people
20th-century American male actors
21st-century American male actors
American male film actors
American male television actors
Jewish American male actors
Male actors from New York City
21st-century American Jews